Enigma is a Thailand television drama series starring Metawin Opas-iamkajorn and Chanikan Tangkabodee. Directed by The Gifted and F4 Thailand director Patha Thongpan and produced by Parbdee Tawesuk. This high school horror and thriller series will air in 2023.

Synopsis 
The story revolves around Fa (Chanikan Tankabodee), a high school student, who becomes entangled in a series of strange events. These events coincide with the arrival of a new teacher, Ar Jin (Metawin Opas-iamkajorn), prompting Fa to grow increasingly suspicious of the teacher's involvement. As she tries to make sense of the mysterious happenings in the school, Fa sets out to uncover any possible connections between Ar Jin and the events unfolding around her.

Cast and characters

Main 

 Metawin Opas-iamkajorn as Ar Jin.
 Chanikan Tangkabodee as Fa.

Supporting 

 Kanyarat Ruangrung
 Preeyaphat Lawsuwansiri

Soundtrack 
The song Time Don't Move by alternative indie artist Fleurs Douces is played in the beginning of the trailer.

Production 
In November 2022 Sataporn Panichraksapong, managing director of GMMTV announces plans to invest in a 51% stake in Parbdee Taweesuk Co., Ltd. in an effort to grow its business model. This collaboration is expected to raise the potential to create and produce more quality series and increase the reach of Thai content to a wider audience around the world. Producers Kamthorn Lorjitramnuay, Puchong Tuntisungwaragul, and Patha Thongpa represent Parbdee in the signing.

Enigma is one of the television drama series produced by Parbdee that showcased by GMMTV during their DIVERSELY YOURS event on November 22nd, 2022 at Union Hall Bangkok. 

After a period of pre-production, the filming for the TV series officially started on February 20th, 2023.

References

External links 

 GMMTV
 Official trailer
 

Television series by GMMTV
GMM 25 original programming
Science fantasy television series
Television series by Parbdee Taweesuk